The Equitable Towers, formerly Axa Towers, are two commercial office buildings in Syracuse, New York. The towers were originally named the MONY Towers when they were built by Carrier Corporation, and renamed when Axa acquired the MONY group in 2004. They were renamed Equitable Towers in 2020, after Axa was no longer the majority owner of Equitable. The buildings serve as offices for New-York-based Equitable Holdings, and have illuminated logos on top.

Description and history
The west building (Tower I) was completed in 1966 as MONY Tower. The east building (Tower II) was built as Carrier Tower in 1971. They are tied for the second tallest buildings in Syracuse. They were both built with a tube-in-tube structural system with a steel and glass curtain wall facade. Tower I has a weather beacon on its roof, and a digital display of time and temperature which can be seen from the north and south sides of the building.

Name changes
Both towers have long featured illuminated logos of their respective companies on top of the buildings. Five names have appeared on the towers since they were completed. Tower I started life as MONY Tower; Tower II was initially known as the Carrier Tower. Then both became MONY Towers, followed by the name Axa Equitable Towers, then simply Axa Towers.

In January 2020 the buildings were renamed Equitable Towers, as the buildings’ anchor tenant rebranded itself as Equitable Holdings. The Equitable name and logo appeared on the buildings starting September 2020.

See also
List of tallest buildings in Syracuse
List of tallest buildings in Upstate New York

References

External links
 Building with "AXA EQUITABLE" name in 2011

Skyscrapers in Syracuse, New York
Skyscraper office buildings in New York (state)
Office buildings completed in 1966
Office buildings completed in 1971